The Reckitt & Colman Building Facade, also referred to as The Wedding Wall, is the facade of the former Reckitt & Colman building on the corner of High and Cliff Streets in Fremantle.  Like many places in Fremantle, including the Strelitz Buildings in Mouat Street, the Reckitt & Colman building was created through the addition of a street side facade to existing buildings in the 1890s. These buildings were demolished in 1967 but the facade along Cliff Street was retained with windows and doorways being infilled. In 1974 the facade was listed by the National Trust of Australia. , the structure separates Cliff Street and a parking lot.

References

Cliff Street, Fremantle
High Street, Fremantle
State Register of Heritage Places in the City of Fremantle